Zoogloea oleivorans is a gram-negative bacterium from the genus of Zoogloea. Its type strain was isolated from a filter for petroleum hydrocarbons from a site in Hungary.

References

External links 

Type strain of Zoogloea oleivorans at BacDive -  the Bacterial Diversity Metadatabase

Rhodocyclaceae
Bacteria described in 2015
Zoogloeaceae